Puthu Kavithai is a 2013 Tamil language soap opera starring Maheshwari Chanakyan, Dinesh, Feroz Khan and Saberna. It was shown on Vijay TV from 16 December 2013 to 29 May 2015 on Monday to Friday at 6:30pm (IST) for 361 episodes. It was produced by Rightfeel Productions and D. Parthasarathy and was directed by D. Parthasarathy. It is a story of a woman (Maheswari) who will go to any lengths to fight for her right.

Plot
The story takes place in a small town in Rameswaram. Kavya and Divya are Ramanathan's children. He leads a traditional and respectable family in the town, and as a good father intends to give a good education to both of his daughters irrespective of the family condition. Meanwhile, Dhanushkodi, who is of no use in the town at all and is a nuisance, develops a secret admiration for Kavya. Dhanush convinces himself that Kavya should be his life partner.

Cast

Awards and nominations

International broadcast
The series was released on 16 December 2013 on Vijay TV. It was also broadcast internationally on Channel's international distribution. 
 It was shown in Sri Lanka, Singapore, Vietnam, Japan, Hong Kong, United States, Europe, Malaysia, Mauritius and South Africa on Vijay TV. 
 In Canada, it was on the Tamil Canadians-oriented channel on Asian Television Network 9:30 hours after its original Tamil Nadu broadcast with English subtitles
 The drama’s episodes are available on the Hotstar app. Some episodes have English subtitles.

References

External links

Star Vijay original programming
Tamil-language romance television series
2013 Tamil-language television series debuts
Tamil-language television shows
2015 Tamil-language television series endings
Tamil-language television series based on Hindi-language television series